Arika Okrent  is an American linguist and writer of popular works on linguistic topics.

Early life and education
Okrent was born in Chicago to parents of Polish and Transylvanian descent. She was fascinated by languages beginning at an early age, which is what made her pursue a career in linguistics.  

After graduating from Carleton College in 1992, she left for Hungary to teach there for a year. She earned an M.A. in Linguistics from the Gallaudet University, and a Ph.D. in Psycholinguistics from the University of Chicago in 2004.

Career 
Okrent is known particularly for her 2009 book In the Land of Invented Languages: Esperanto Rock Stars, Klingon Poets, Loglan Lovers, and the Mad Dreamers Who Tried to Build A Perfect Language, a result of her five years of research into the topic of constructed languages.  Her well-received 2021 book, Highly Irregular, written with Sean O'Neill, explains how the history of English explains a number of its modern irregularities and exceptions.

She is featured in Sam Green's 2011 Esperanto documentary entitled, The Universal Language.

She is a regular contributor on linguistics and language topics to the online magazine Mental Floss.

Honors and awards 
In 2015 Okrent became the second winner of the Linguistic Society of America's Linguistics Journalism Award.

Personal life
She can communicate in English, Hungarian, American Sign Language and Klingon, and has a good passive command of Esperanto.

She is the niece of writer and editor Daniel Okrent.

Books

References

External links
 Arika Okrent's homepage
 In the Land of Invented Languages by Arika Okrent

Year of birth missing (living people)
Living people
Linguists from the United States
Women linguists
American Esperantists
Gallaudet University alumni
University of Chicago alumni
Linguistics Journalism Award recipients
1970 births